The 2012–13 Bhutan National League was the first season of the Bhutan National League. It was organized by the Bhutan Football Federation and sponsored by Coca-Cola. The National League replaced the A-Division as the country's premier football competition and would provide Bhutan's entrant to the 2013 AFC President's Cup. the A-Division continues as a football competition, but is now merely a qualifying round for Thimpu-based teams. The top three teams in the A-Division progressed to the national league where they were joined by three other teams representing other districts within Bhutan. The A-Division was won by Druk Pol, but were beaten to the national title by fellow A-Division competitors Yeedzin who won the inaugural competition, their fifth top flight title overall.

2012 A-Division
The 2012 Bhutanese A-Division was the twenty sixth season of football in Bhutan. It began on 31 August 2012 and ended on 6 October 2012. As the only stadium used in the league was the Changlimithang Stadium in Thimphu, matches were played one per day, with a mid-season break from 16 to 20 September. As there was only one stadium used, the 6 teams were designated so that each team played 5 "home" games and 5 "away" games. This season marked the end of the Thimpu-based league being the top league in the country. The A-Division will now act as a qualifying tournament for the Bhutan National League, a nationwide tournament that will now provide the qualifier for the 2013 AFC President's Cup.

Overview
The A-Division was won by Druk Pol for the 8th time in their history, their first title since 2003. Druk Pol, together with Zimdra and Yeedzin, qualify for the 2012–13 Bhutan National League, which include these three teams from Thimpu together with four other teams representing the districts of Punakha, Geylegphug, Samtse and Chukha.

League standings

Results

National League

Teams

A total of six teams competed in the league: three teams representing Thimphu, and three teams representing other districts.
Druk Pol (winners of 2012 A-Division)
Zimdra (runners-up of 2012 A-Division)
Yeedzin (third place of 2012 A-Division)
Ugyen Academy (representing Punakha District)
Samtse (representing Samtse District)
Phuentsholing (representing Chukha District)
Originally also a team representing Gelephug District was supposed to enter.

League standings

Results

References

Bhutan National League seasons
Bhutan
1
1